The Holden Nunataks are a group of about four nunataks rising to  near the head of Mosby Glacier, to the south of the Journal Peaks in south-central Palmer Land, Antarctica. They were mapped by the United States Geological Survey from aerial photographs taken by the U.S. Navy, 1966–69. The group was surveyed by the British Antarctic Survey (BAS), 1974–75, and named by the UK Antarctic Place-Names Committee after Godfrey A. Holden, a BAS general assistant who took part in the survey, and was later Station Commander at Rothera Station, 1977–78.

References

Nunataks of Palmer Land